The 1999–2000 Elitserien was the 66th season of the top division of Swedish handball. 12 teams competed in the league. The league was split into an autumn league and a spring league. The eight highest placed teams in the autumn league qualified for the spring league, whereas the four lowest placed teams qualified for Allsvenskan along with the highest placed teams from the autumn season of Division I (the second level). The six highest placed teams in the spring season of Elitserien qualified for the quarterfinals, whereas the two lowest placed teams qualified for the preliminary round of the playoffs, along with the two highest placed teams of Allsvenskan. Redbergslids IK won the regular season and also won the playoffs to claim their 18th Swedish title.

League tables

Autumn

Spring

Playoffs

First round

Alingsås HK–IFK Ystad 24–18
IFK Ystad–Alingsås HK 22–32
Alingsås HK won 56–40 on aggregate

H 43 Lund–HP Warta 17–18
HP Warta–H 43 Lund 24–22
HP Warta won 42–39 on aggregate

Quarterfinals

 Redbergslid–Warta 21–19
 Warta–Redbergslid 16–23  
 Redbergslid–Warta 27–18 
Redbergslid won series 3–0

 Drott–Alingsås 25–22  
 Alingsås–Drott 25–28  
 Drott–Alingsås 28–17  
Drott won series 3–0

 Guif–Lugi 20–18  
 Lugi–Guif 27–15  
 Guif–Lugi 25–16  
 Lugi–Guif 17–22  
Guif won series 3–1

 Skövde–Sävehof 22–29  
 Sävehof–Skövde 18–20  
 Skövde–Sävehof 19–20  
 Sävehof–Skövde 18–20 
 Skövde–Sävehof 24–21
Skövde won series 3–2

Semifinals

 Redbergslid–Skövde 24–19 
 Skövde–Redbergslid 18–22 
 Redbergslid–Skövde 22–21
Redbergslid won series 3–0
 
 Drott–Guif 29–26  
 Guif–Drott 27–34  
 Drott–Guif 26–18
Drott won series 3–0

Finals

 Redbergslid–Drott 28–20  
 Drott–Redbergslid 26–24  
 Redbergslid–Drott 25–22
Redbergslid won series 2–1

References 

Swedish handball competitions